Pat Davies is an English bridge player.

Pat Davies may also refer to:
Pat Davies (footballer), English women's footballer
Pat Davies (rugby union) (1903–1979), English rugby union player
Pat Davies (badminton), English badminton player, 1976 winner of Welsh International